The 1819 New Hampshire gubernatorial election was held on March 9, 1819.

Incumbent Democratic-Republican Governor William Plumer did not run for re-election.

Democratic-Republican nominee Samuel Bell defeated Federalist nominee William Hale.

General election

Candidates
Samuel Bell, Democratic-Republican, associate justice of the New Hampshire Superior Court of Judicature
William Hale, Federalist, former U.S. Representative

Results

Notes

References

1819
New Hampshire
Gubernatorial